Savinskaya is a rural locality (a village) in Tiginskoye Rural Settlement, Vozhegodsky District, Vologda Oblast, Russia. The population was 91 as of 2002.

Geography 
The distance to Vozhega is 24 km, to Gridino is 4 km. Konevka, Shchegolikha, Malaya, Pozhar, Petrovka, Levinskaya are the nearest rural localities.

References 

Rural localities in Vozhegodsky District